Brunška Gora (in older sources also Bruniška Gora) is a small dispersed settlement in the Municipality of Radeče in eastern Slovenia. The area is part of the historical region of Lower Carniola and the municipality is now included in the Lower Sava Statistical Region; until January 2014 it was part of the Savinja Statistical Region.

References

External links
Brunška Gora at Geopedia

Populated places in the Municipality of Radeče